The Legon Botanical Gardens  is located in the University of Ghana, Accra. It is owned by the University of Ghana and managed by both the Department of Botany and Mulch Company Ltd. It has a natural vegetation of 50 hectares. It was founded in 1950. It is a recreational center with a playground, canopy walks, and natural outdoor space with lakes.

History 
The idea that birth the botanical garden was out of love for outdoor and adventure which resulted in a partnership by Mulch Company Limited in partnership with a Dutch company.

Activities 

 Children's Playground
 High Rope Course
 Junior Rope Course
 Canoeing
 Canopy Walk
 The Woodlands
 Bird Watching
 Fishing
 Cycling

References

Botanical gardens in Ghana